Eliad Moreh-Rosenberg is an art curator living in Jerusalem. Since 2014, she is Yad Vashem’s Art Department Director and curator. 

Born in Paris, Eliad moved to Israel at the age of 18. She is the daughter of artist Mordecai Moreh and niece of scholar orientalist Prof. Shmuel Moreh, recipient of  Israel Prize in Middle Eastern studies in 1999.

Eliad received her B.A. in Art History and English Literature and her M.A. in Art History from the Hebrew University of Jerusalem. Between 1997 to 2002 she worked as a researcher at the Hebrew University’s Center for Jewish Art. 

On July 31, 2002, she survived fatal terror attack at the Hebrew University in Jerusalem. While she was having lunch with her friend David Diego Ladowski at the university’s Frank Sinatra cafeteria, a Hamas terrorist, who worked in the University, detonated a bomb that killed nine people, among them Ladowski (29), and wounded more than 85. Eliad’s stunning pictures from the scene and words were beamed across the world and she was interviewed in major international news outlets. 

After recovering from her wounds, Eliad participated in numerous delegations of victims of terrorism, including those organized by the Israeli Foreign Ministry to the European Union, the Hague and Greece. She met with European and American politicians and  high officials.  Additionally, she was invited on  a speaking tour in the Boston area, giving lectures at the universities of Brandeis, Wellesley College, Harvard and MIT. As a survivor of terror, Eliad believes that terrorism must be condemned and fought. Every effort must be done to promote education for tolerance and warrant the sanctity of life.

In 2003, she joined the Yad Vashem Art Museum’s staff, where today she serves as curator and director of the Art Department. Her exhibitions in Yad Vashem include "Last Portrait: Painting for Posterity" (2012) which was accompanied by a catalogue she authored, and "The Anguish of Liberation as Reflected in Art: 1945-1947". In January 2016, she curated the exhibition "Art from the Holocaust: 100 Works from the Yad Vashem Collection" at the Deutsches Historisches Museum in Berlin which was accompanied by a catalogue she co-edited. The exhibition which was opened by the German Chancellor, Mrs. Angela Merkel, attracted a record number of visitors and received international media coverage. For her achievements, she was nominated for the European Cultural Manager Award in 2017 and received the Lifetime Achievement Award, in the category of "European Cultural Manager 2021," of the European Cultural Brands Awards at a ceremony in Dresden.

References
Director of Yad Vashem's Art Collection, Eliad Moreh Rosenberg, Receives The Lifetime Achievement Award of the 2021 European Cultural Brands Award

Living people
20th-century French Jews
French people of Iraqi-Jewish descent
Suicide bombing in the Israeli–Palestinian conflict
French emigrants to Israel
Year of birth missing (living people)